The following highways are numbered 970:

Australia 

  - Greensborough Hwy

Canada
 New Brunswick Route 970
 Saskatchewan Highway 970

United States